Bernice M. Watson (August 16, 1901April 15, 1980) was a Michigan politician.

Early life
Watson was born on August 16, 1901 in Breckenridge, Michigan.

Education
Watson earned a A.B. from Central Michigan University. Watson also received special training in public speaking and dramatics graduate study from the University of Michigan and Michigan State College.

Career
Watson worked as a teacher and a principal. Watson was a member of the Michigan Education Association and the National Education Association. On November 5, 1946, Watson was elected to the Michigan House of Representatives where she represented the Genesee County 1st district from January 1, 1947 to 1948.

Personal life
Watson was the widow of a World War I veteran and was a member of the American Legion Auxiliary. She had one child. Watson was Baptist.

Death
Watson died on April 15, 1980 in Flint, Michigan.

References

1901 births
1980 deaths
People from Gratiot County, Michigan
Baptists from Michigan
Central Michigan University alumni
University of Michigan alumni
Michigan State University alumni
Women state legislators in Michigan
Republican Party members of the Michigan House of Representatives
20th-century American women politicians
20th-century American politicians
20th-century Baptists